Palmer Trinity School is an independent, college-preparatory, coeducational Episcopal day school located on  in Palmetto Bay, Florida (a Miami suburb). The school currently enrolls more than 770 students in grades 6–12.

Palmer Trinity is the only Episcopal middle school and secondary school in Miami-Dade County, and along with Saint Andrew's School in Boca Raton, is one of two secondary schools in the Episcopal Diocese of Southeast Florida. The school is accredited by the Southern Association of Colleges and Schools and the Florida Council of Independent Schools.

History 

Palmer Trinity School was formed in 1991 when Palmer School (founded in 1972) and Trinity Episcopal School (founded in 1981) merged. The school was formerly located in the census-designated place of Cutler until the incorporation of Palmetto Bay on September 10, 2002.

Palmer Trinity was badly damaged by Hurricane Andrew, but one building was used to host the 82nd Airborne for 6 weeks in the aftermath.

After the merger, Palmer Trinity gradually grew from 300 to 650 students. A Humanities Building, Music Center, Fitness Facility, Math/Science Building, and expanded Library were added to the original three buildings.

Palmer Trinity's campus incorporates South Florida flora, including gumbo limbo trees, royal poincianas, palms, ferns, and orchids. It has the largest grounds of any independent school in Miami-Dade County.

It has encouraged the use of wireless laptop computers since 1999, and has 50 athletic teams.

Today Palmer Trinity’s students, over 50% of whom are bilingual, come from 37 countries. Students come from Christian, Jewish, Islamic, and Hindu religious backgrounds.

Palmer Trinity has attempted to expand its campus onto a neighboring 33 acre property since 2006. A legal debate that has been in and out of appellate courts has cost millions of dollars to both Village of Palmetto Bay and Palmer Trinity.

The Coral Lab 

The school's Coral Lab is an interdisciplinary center for education, training, and research in marine biology engaging in research in the laboratory and in the field, studying ocean organisms and environmental problems. Many students ultimately choose a career in marine science, biology, or policy. Courses offered include marine conservation, biology of corals, coral propagation, aquarium fish breeding, and mangrove ecology.

Breakthrough Miami partnership 

Started during the 2009–2010 school year, Palmer Trinity School's partnership with Breakthrough Miami gave way to Breakthrough's first expansion site into Southwest Miami-Dade County. During the summer more than 150 rising 5th-, 6th-, 7th-, and 8th-grade students visit the school for Breakthrough's Summer Institute at PTS, and it hosts sessions throughout the year.

Breakthrough Miami is modeled after the Summerbridge (later Breakthrough Collaborative) program founded in San Francisco,  California, by Louis Loufbourrow in 1978.

Notable alumni

Patrick Murphy (Class of 2001), US congressman (18th congressional district)
Ciara Michel (Class of 2003), member of 2012 British Olympic volleyball team
Alejandro Melean (Class of 2005), member of Bolivia national football team
Tim Hardaway Jr. (freshman year only), professional basketball player
Shea Adam (Class of 2008), sports commentator
Angela Guzman, graphic designer best known for designing the Apple Emoji

References

External links 
 Palmer Trinity School

Private schools in Miami-Dade County, Florida
High schools in Miami-Dade County, Florida
Private high schools in Florida
Private middle schools in Florida
Episcopal schools in the United States
Christian schools in Florida